Carolina Beach is a beach town in New Hanover County, North Carolina, United States, situated about  south of Wilmington International Airport in southeastern coastal North Carolina. As of the 2020 census, the city population was 6,564.  It is part of the Wilmington metropolitan area. The community of Wilmington Beach was annexed by the town in 2000.

Carolina Beach lies at the northern end of Pleasure Island, which it shares with the community of Kure Beach, south of the inlet that separates the island from the unincorporated community of Sea Breeze.

Geography
Carolina Beach is located at  (34.036796, -77.896939).

Demographics

2020 census

As of the 2020 United States census, there were 6,564 people, 2,876 households, and 1,764 families residing in the town.

2013
As of the census of 2013, there were 2,296 households, and 1,253 families residing in the town. The population density was 2,086.4 people per square mile (806.7/km2). There were 4,086 housing units at an average density of 1,813.5 per square mile (701.2/km2). The racial makeup of the town was 98.94% White, 0.39% African American,0.50% Asian, and 0.17% from other races.

There were 2,296 households, out of which 18.3% had children under the age of 18 living with them, 43.5% were married couples living together, 7.7% had a female householder with no husband present, and 45.4% were non-families. 35.1% of all households were made up of individuals, and 7.6% had someone living alone 65 years of age or older. The average household size was 2.03, and the average family size was 2.59.

The population was spread out in the town, with 14.8% under the age of 18, 7.1% from 18 to 24, 31.0% from 25 to 44, 34.5% from 45 to 64, and 12.7% who were 65 years of age or older. The median age was 44 years. For every 100 females, there were 103.6 males. For every 100 females age 18 and over, there were 104.0 males.

The median income for a household in the town was $37,662, and the median income for a family was $44,882. Males had a median income of $31,013 versus $21,241 for females. The per capita income for the town was $24,128. About 8.4% of families and 14.4% of the population were below the poverty line, including 10.9% of those under age 18 and none of those age 65 or over.

Education
The New Hanover County Schools district covers Carolina Beach. Only Carolina Beach Elementary School, founded in 1937, is located in the town. Older students are assigned to Charles P. Murray Middle School and Eugene Ashley High School in Wilmington.

History
The town was "wiped off the map" by Hurricane Hazel in 1954. Reportedly, 362 buildings were destroyed in the town.

Points of interest
 Carolina Beach Pier
 LORAN-C transmitter Carolina Beach
 Fort Fisher
 North Carolina Aquarium at Fort Fisher
 Carolina Beach State Park
 Joy Lee Apartment Building and Annex, and Newton Homesite and Cemetery are listed on the National Register of Historic Places.
Freeman Park - Located on the North end of Carolina Beach where beachgoers can drive onto the beach with a 4WD vehicle and camp overnight.
Pleasure Island Sea Turtle Project
Island Greenway
Federal Point Historic Preservation Society
Britt's Donuts
Carolina Beach Mooring Field

Pictures

References

External links

 
 Official Town of Carolina Beach, NC website

Towns in North Carolina
Towns in New Hanover County, North Carolina
Beaches of North Carolina
Cape Fear (region)
Landforms of New Hanover County, North Carolina
Populated coastal places in North Carolina